Georgian Popescu (born October 20, 1984) is an amateur boxer from Romania.  He qualified to complete at the 2008 Summer Olympics in the lightweight division.

References

Boxers at the 2008 Summer Olympics
Olympic boxers of Romania
1984 births
Living people
Romanian male boxers
Lightweight boxers